Andrew Hall is a Scotland international rugby union player. A second row forward, he played for Moseley, Glasgow Warriors and Newport Gwent Dragons.  On retirement from the game he was appointed Head Rugby Coach at the Hong Kong Cricket Club. Hall has since moved on to work directly for the HKRU where he is Head Coach for the Hong Kong National Mens XV's team and Head of Mens Performance and Development.

Outside of day to day coaching, Hall also does public speaking, MC's events and is currently completing his PhD on 'High performance cultures'.

References

 https://www.hkrugby.com/news/andrew-hall-takes-over-as-head-coach-of-hong-kong-rugby-team
 https://www.ultimaterugby.com/news/andrew-hall-takes-over-as-new-coach-of-hong-kong-rugby-national-team/616796
 https://www.thestandard.com.hk/section-news/section/8/208163/Hall-promises-to-do-better-on-return-as-HK-coach
 https://www.scmp.com/sport/rugby/article/3083338/hong-kong-rugby-coach-andrew-hall-recounts-pivotal-game-cook-islands

External links
Newport Gwent Dragons Profile

1979 births
Living people
Rugby union locks
Scottish rugby union players
Dragons RFC players
Moseley Rugby Football Club players
Scotland international rugby union players
Rugby union players from Solihull
Glasgow Warriors players
Anglo-Scots
Scottish rugby union coaches
Scottish expatriate sportspeople in Hong Kong